Warwick School is a selective, independent boarding and day school in Warwick, England in the public school tradition.

Known until about 1900 as King's School, Warwick, it is believed to have been founded by Æthelflæd of Mercia in 914 AD, making it the fifth-oldest surviving school in England, after King's School, Canterbury; King's School, Rochester; St Peter's School, York; and Wells Cathedral School. It may also be the oldest surviving school founded by a woman and the oldest public school in the world to remain open only to boys. Its headmasters have been members of the Headmasters' and Headmistresses' Conference since 1896.

The school is part of the Warwick Independent Schools Foundation, which also owns The King's High School for Girls and Warwick Preparatory School.

History

Early beginnings and the move to St Mary's

The town of Warwick was first recorded in the 9th and 10th century Anglo-Saxon Chronicle in 914 during the rule of Æthelflæd, daughter of Alfred the Great. Warwick School was active in the time of King Edward the Confessor (1042–1066) and probably for at least a century earlier, most likely in the grounds of Warwick Castle.  By 1477 lessons were held in the old church of St John the Baptist in the Market Place. In 1545 King Henry VIII re-founded the school as "The King's New Scole of Warwyke" and the new grammar school moved to what is now the Lord Leycester Hospital. Later it moved again to St Peter's Chapel, now part of King's High School.  Schoolmasters in the 17th century included the epigrammatist John Owen (1595–1622) and Rev Thomas DuGard (1633–49), later Rector of Barford Church, who recorded the history and daily life of the school in his Latin diary.
Around 1697 the school moved to the disused medieval buildings of the Vicars Choral in St Mary's churchyard, and stayed there for the next 200 years.

Victorian era: growth followed by crisis

In the Victorian era, the Rev. Herbert Hill, headmaster from 1842 to 1876, implemented several educational reforms and a modern curriculum was introduced. Three new schools were proposed in the 1870s, and had all begun operations by 1879: The King's Grammar School, on a new site south of the River Avon, with a classical curriculum; The King's Middle School in The Butts, providing a "commercial education" for "less academic" boys; and King's High School, in Landor House, Smith Street. The Junior Department (now the Junior School) opened in 1889. In 1887 "The Limes" (16 lime trees) were planted to mark Queen Victoria's Golden Jubilee.

The years 1896 to 1906 were ones of increasing crisis for the school, however, culminating in its economic collapse and temporary closure, the flight of the headmaster, the sacking of all the staff and the withdrawal of most of the boys. In 1906, the grammar school merged with the King's Middle School.

The World Wars and independence

Under the physicist H. S. Pyne, headmaster from 1906 to 1928, the school rapidly grew in numbers. By the late 1920s, there were almost 400 boys in the school, including 146 boarders, almost double the planned number.

The First World War had a shattering effect on the school. Eighty-eight Old Warwickians, including Pyne's son, were killed, as well as two former schoolmasters.  Pyne paid for the chapel gallery and west window as a war memorial.

The new headmaster appointed in 1928, G. A. Riding, previously a housemaster at Rugby School, saw himself as a "new broom sweeping clean", after the school had undergone some decline. His time in charge was controversial and was marred by two arson attacks in 1930.  In 1933, he was succeeded by Eric Percival Smith, who also did not stay long, leaving in 1936.

Headmaster A. H. B. Bishop served the school from 1936 to 1962. During the Second World War, the number of boys grew, increasing to 450 by 1946.  It was difficult to appoint and retain adequate staff, and between 1939 and 1940 the school was forced to share its premises with a school evacuated from Birmingham.

The Butler Education Act was enacted in 1944, and one of its effects was to put an end to the substantial Local Education Authority subsidy to the school. In 1946, the governors were forced to declare that Warwick School would have to become private.

Late 20th Century stability

By 1962, there were 742 pupils and 44 staff in the senior and junior schools combined. Recognition for the school included a visit by Queen Elizabeth the Queen Mother in 1958, as well as earlier visits by Viscount Montgomery of Alamein and Sir Anthony Eden (Prime Minister 1955–1957).

Notable modernisation efforts were undertaken by the headmasters P. W. Martin (1962 to 1977) and Dr P. J. Cheshire (1988 to 2002), who both extensively improved the school's buildings and facilities. All teaching in the original 1879 classrooms finished, and a museum and functions room was opened, named the Portcullis Room. In 1995, the school roll reached 1,000 pupils for the first time.

In the 2000s, Sixth form girls from the King's High School were allowed to participate in certain school activities, and some joint teaching started. The school's rugby team won the Daily Mail Cup in 2007, and the school's concert band and drama students received national recognition.

Two histories of the school have been published: History of Warwick School by A. F. Leach (1906) and Warwick School, A History by G. N. Frykman and E. J. Hadley (2004). Gervald Frykman was the school's first Archivist, and Eric Hadley edited the school's yearly chronicle The Portcullis.  A second edition of Frykman and Hadley was published in 2014, to commemorate the assumed 1,100th anniversary of the foundation of the school.

Modern buildings 

Although the 1879 buildings are still in use, there have been many additions. All teaching now takes place in specialised departmental areas.

The Junior School, opened in 1889, is next to the main school. Although it closed and re-opened several times in the first half of the twentieth century, it has been fully operational since 1938. In 2006 it catered for over 240 boys from 7 to 11 years of age, the majority of whom were expected to pass into the senior school.

A new Science Centre, designed by Brown Matthews Architects Ltd., opened in June 2007. It houses biology, physics and chemistry laboratories. It was built on the site of the original 1879 sanatorium.

The former main hall of the school, the Guy Nelson Hall, was built, following an appeal, between 1969 and 1970, and was named after Alderman Guy Nelson, a long-serving Chairman of Governors, in office from 1938 to 1963. It had seating for about 600 people, but by 2010 this was much less than the total size of the school, with the result that a new building was planned. The hall was demolished in 2015 and was replaced by a much larger one, Warwick Hall, opened in September 2016 by Sir Michael Attenborough.

The school's theatre, called the Bridge House Theatre, has seating for around 310 people. Intended from the outset to be used both by the school and by local organisations in the town, it was designed by Michael Reardon Associates and was opened on 1 May 2000 by Dame Judi Dench.

In March 2013, the revamped and modernised Sports Pavilion, renamed the Halse Sports Pavilion after former headmaster Edward B. Halse (2002–2013), was opened in a ceremony led by the politician and former track and field athlete Sebastian Coe. On 2 June 2014, as the climax of the Jubilee year, Charles, Prince of Wales, visited the school and unveiled a commemorative plaque.

Entrance 
Entrance to Warwick School is competitive, with admissions judged by a combination of internal exams and interview for both the junior and senior schools. Entry to the senior school is permitted at 11+, 13+ and Sixth form (or Upper School). For the Upper School, at age 16, admissions are judged by subject-specific exams and interviews and offers are conditional upon GCSE and IGCSE results.

In 2019–20 there were 969 boys in the senior school (aged 11 to 18), and 250 in the junior school (aged 7 to 11).

Houses 

Boys in the senior school are assigned to one of six houses which compete against each other in sports and other activities, such as debating. The six houses are named after people connected with the history of the town of Warwick (Tudor, Guy, Greville, Brooke, Oken, and Leycester). The school's two boarding houses, Way House and School House, are separate from the main house system, with boarders being members of both a boarding house and one of the six main houses.

The Junior School has four houses named after historical figures with no special connection to Warwick (Drake, Scott, Wellington, and Nelson).

Traditions

Visit of the Town Crier

The Town Crier of Warwick traditionally visits the school to announce an added week of holiday for the Michaelmas half term. The ceremony involves a speech, read from a parchment to the whole school in the chapel quad, a mock discussion with the headmaster, and the declaration of the holiday, to cheers from the boys. The Town Crier then takes up a collection for charity from the pupils and staff. This tradition is believed to date back to at least 1912.

The School Arms 

The Rev. John Pearce Way, headmaster from 1885 to 1896, was the first to attempt to draw up a school coat of arms. He also commissioned the first written history of the school, attempted to change its name from The King's School, Warwick, to Warwick School, and introduced a school song and a school motto.  He succeeded with the school motto, Altiora Peto (I seek higher things), introduced in 1893, but neither the name change nor the coat of arms were legally established.

Horace Seymour Pyne, headmaster from 1906 to 1928, also attempted to create a coat of arms – again irregularly, without a grant from the College of Arms – and caused it to be incorporated into the stained glass window of the chapel, where it remains.

George Riding, headmaster from 1928 to 1933, eventually took the appropriate legal steps to obtain a coat of arms, which was granted to Warwick School in 1931. Riding designed the coat of arms, which is blazoned (described heraldically) as follows:

Arms: Gules, a cross flory in the first quarter a Fleur-de-lys Or, on a chief of the second three martlets Azure.
Crest: On a wreath Or and Gules, upon a portcullis chained Or a bear erect Argent muzzled Gules supporting a ragged staff also Argent.
Motto: Altiora Peto (I seek higher things)

The three azure (blue) martlets are heraldic swallows, depicted without feet because of a medieval belief that they could not perch on the ground.  Like the large golden cross, they are emblems used by King Edward the Confessor, reputed to be one of the original founders of the school.  The gold fleur-de-lys and portcullis are emblems of King Henry VIII, who re-founded the school in 1545, and the Bear and Ragged Staff have been the crest of the family of the Earl of Warwick since at least the 14th century.

Uniform

Regular Uniform

In the 1920s the uniform at Warwick School was simple: clothing was expected to be black, although trousers were also allowed to be grey and neckties dark blue. Boys below a certain height (5'6", or 1.68m) were required to wear the unpopular and uncomfortable Eton collar. In the 1930s the current uniform was introduced: a navy blue blazer, worn with a white shirt (or grey in junior school), black or charcoal trousers (with shorts for Junior School), and a tie. Sixth form dress is a dark grey or navy suit.

Ties and awards

Special ties are awarded to pupils for achievement in different areas, and can be worn in place of their regular school tie:

 Prefect tie: red and silver stripes
 Full colours (for sport, drama and music): silver/white and blue stripes
 Half colours (for sport, drama and music): blue and silver/white stripes (an inversion of "full colours")

Boarders also have a system for recognition of officials in their houses, being:

 Head of boarding house – gold badge and prefect tie
 Boarding prefects – silver badges and prefect tie

Heads of House are promoted from the existing prefect body, with the roles of deputy Head of House and captains of individual sports now being honorary.

School magazines

The Portcullis and The Free Press are the official school magazines, the first having been in print since the late 19th century. Both are contributed to by the boys of the school, with the latter having a tradition of mocking and satirising school policies and teacher. Individual subjects also have their own publications, including The Scientist (Science) and Generation Rising (English).

School Song 

The school has had two main songs throughout its history. Currently, the 1906 Latin song Floreat Domus is sung quite regularly - in chapel at the beginning of every term, and at Speech Day, for example. The original English School Song however is reserved now only for Old Warwickian gatherings, not being sung throughout the normal school year.

Floreat Domus 

Gaudeamus nos alumni

Quod per infinita saecla

Schola perduravit ipsa.

Gaudeamus nos alumni.

Floreat! Floreat!

Schola Warwicensis

Floret atque floreat

Schola Warwicensis.

Haec domus duret per aevum

Floreant omnes alumni

Floreant semper magistri.

Gaudeamus nos alumni.

Floreat! Floreat!

Schola Warwicensis

Floret atque floreat

Schola Warwicensis.

Head Masters

Notable Old Warwickians

Notable Old Warwickians include:

Politics and public life
 Daniel Byles: Guinness World Record holding ocean rower and polar explorer, Conservative MP for North Warwickshire 2010–2015. Head of House 1985 – 1992
 Harry Greenway: Conservative MP for Ealing until 1997
 Colin Jordan: National Organiser of the British National Party
 Sir Stephen Lovegrove: UK National Security Adviser
 Frederick, Lord Mulley: Secretary of State for Defence, later Secretary of State for Education and Science
 Sir Thomas Puckering : MP and Sheriff of Warwickshire
 Sir Tim Barrow: British diplomat
 Steven Fisher: British diplomat
 Daniel Dalton: Conservative politician and former professional cricketer
 Tony Whittaker: co-founder and first leader of PEOPLE, forerunner of the Green Party
 Joseph Parkes: Political reformer

Religion
 Abiezer Coppe: 17th century "ranting" Baptist preacher
 John Ley: clergyman and religious controversialist
 Henry Teonge: diarist, naval chaplain and Warwickshire parson
 John Richardson: Archbishop of Fredericton
 Samuel Dugard: Anglican Divine
 John Ryland: Baptist minister

Sport
 A G K Brown: Olympic gold medallist 1936, head boy 1933 – 1934
 Jamie Elson: member of the winning UK&I Walker Cup Golf Team defeating the US in 2001
 Christian Horner: Team Principal – Red Bull Racing
 Ben Howard: Rugby Union Player – Worcester Warriors
 Robert Challoner: Australian rugby union player
 John Hacking: cricketer for Warwickshire
 Jack Marshall: cricketer for Warwickshire
 Ward Maule: cricketer and clergyman
 Marko Stanojevic: Italian rugby union player
 Chris Whiteside: cricketer for Middlesex
 Sidney Nelson Crowther: Rugby union international
 Paul Ramage: cricketer and later a head master
 Charlie Hayter: England Sevens rugby international
 Jamie Shillcock: Worcester Warriors rugby player
 Geoffrey Tedstone: cricketer for Warwickshire and Gloucestershire
 Nick David: Worcester Warriors rugby player
 Tom Dodd: Worcester Warriors rugby player
Rob Yates: cricketer for Warwickshire

Entertainment
 Sabine Baring-Gould: author of Onward, Christian Soldiers
 Eric Hope: concert pianist
 Denis Matthews: concert pianist
 Rod Thomas: musician, Bright Light Bright Light
 Michael Billington: author, critic & broadcaster
 John Camkin: journalist, TV sports presenter and businessman
 Simon Cheshire: children's writer
 Marc Elliott: actor, EastEnders
 Charles Piff (alias Charles Kay): Actor
 John Masefield: Poet Laureate
 Iain Pears: novelist
 M J Trow: writer
 Henry Baynton: actor
 John McLusky: James Bond illustrator
 Ben Hanlin: magician
 Joshua McGuire: actor
 James TW: singer/songwriter
 Ferdinand Kingsley: actor (son of Sir Ben Kingsley)
 Edward Chattaway: journalist and editor of The Star from 1930 to 1936
 Francis Wilford-Smith: cartoonist, graphic artist, and producer and archivist of blues music
 Mark Evans: TV Presenter

Science
 Robert Thomson Leiper
 Josiah Court: English physician who determined the cause of miners' nystagmus
 Alfred Nicholson Leeds
 Geoff Wilde: designer of the Rolls-Royce RB211
 Cyril Burt: controversial psychologist known for studies on IQ hereditability.

Industry
 Geoffrey Healey: co-designer, with his father Donald Healey, of Healey and Austin-Healey cars
 William James (railway promoter)
Denys Shortt: businessman)

Military
 Air Commodore Peter J. M. Squires
 Lieutenant-General Peter Strickland

Other
 Sir David Foskett: High Court judge
 John Owen: headmaster c. 1595 – 1622
 Martin Richards: Chief Constable of Sussex Police
 Sir Robert Vyner: Lord Mayor of London

Notable current and former teachers

 John Collett Ryland: Baptist minister
 Alex Burghart: Member of Parliament for Brentwood and Ongar
 Jane Gurnett: actress and current part-time drama teacher
 Geoffrey Tedstone: Former professional cricketer and sports teacher

See also 
List of the oldest schools in the United Kingdom
List of the oldest schools in the world

References

Further reading 
 
 
 
  — The Victoria County History gives a detailed account of the history of education in Warwick from the time of the 1851 census onwards.
 
 
  — Mr Wilmut attended the school from 1953 to 1961.  Pictures on the site include the New Buildings and Orlits, which were demolished in 1974 and 1995 respectively.

External links 

 Official website
 ISI Inspection Reports
 What's On at the Bridge House Theatre

914 establishments
10th-century establishments in England
Boarding schools in Warwickshire
Buildings and structures in Warwick
Educational institutions established in the 10th century
Private schools in Warwickshire
Member schools of the Headmasters' and Headmistresses' Conference
Organisations based in England with royal patronage
 
School buildings completed in 1879